Cheng San Public Library is a public library in Hougang, located inside Hougang Mall. It is the third library of the National Library Board to be located in a mall and the first to acquire and display works by local artists. It is near Hougang MRT station and Hougang Central Bus Interchange.

History
Officially opened on 6 March 1997 by Zainul Abidin, Member of Parliament for Cheng San GRC (Punggol East), Cheng San Public Library serves the residents of Hougang, Cheng San, Serangoon Central and Upper Paya Lebar. Originally known as Cheng San Community Library, it was renamed as Cheng San Public Library in 2008.

Layout
Covering an area of 1467 m2, it contains a children’s section, a new arrivals section, a newspaper reading corner and an adult section on level 3 of the mall.

See also
National Library Board
List of libraries in Singapore

References

External links
 National Library Board

Libraries in Singapore
Hougang
1997 establishments in Singapore
Libraries established in 1997